Piq may refer to:
 PiQ (magazine), an American popular culture magazine
 Performance IQ, a sub-type of an intelligence test
 Prefetch input queue, pre-fetched computer instructions stored in a data structure
 Property Information Questionnaire, a document completed by the seller of a property